Time Will Tell is a blues album by Robert Cray. It was released on 1 July 2003, through Sanctuary Records.

Track listing 
 "Survivor" (Cray) - 5:14
 "Up in the Sky" (Pugh) - 4:54
 "Back Door Slam" (Hayes, Hayes) - 4:39
 "I Didn't Know" (Cray) - 5:00
 "Your Pal" (Pugh) - 5:01
 "Lotta Lovin'" (Cray) - 4:52
 "What You Need (Good Man)" (Hayes, Hayes) - 5:16
 "Spare Some Love?" (Cray) - 3:42
 "Distant Shore" (Pugh) - 4:49
 "Time Makes Two" (Cray) - 5:24

Personnel
Robert Cray Band
Robert Cray - guitars, electric bluesitar, vocals
Jim Pugh - keyboards
Kevin Hayes - drums
Karl Sevareid - electric and acoustic bass

Note
Robert Cray performs "Time Makes Two" on Eric Clapton's 2004 Crossroads Guitar Festival DVD.

References

Robert Cray albums
2003 albums
Sanctuary Records albums